The 1985 Pittsburgh Pirates season was the 104th season of the franchise; the 99th in the National League. This was their 16th season at Three Rivers Stadium. The Pirates finished sixth and last in the National League East with a record of 57–104, 43½ games behind the NL Champion St. Louis Cardinals.

Offseason 
The team was beset during the offseason with the triple threat of its longtime owner taking bids for the debt laden franchise, rumors of a possible relocation to cities such as Tampa, Denver and New Orleans and the expanding Pittsburgh drug trials.

Off season transactions included:
 December 12, 1984: Brian Harper and John Tudor were traded by the Pirates to the St. Louis Cardinals for George Hendrick and Steve Barnard (minors).
 December 20, 1984: Jay Buhner, Dale Berra and Alfonso Pulido were traded by the Pirates to the New York Yankees for Steve Kemp, Tim Foli, and cash.
 January 22, 1985: Sixto Lezcano was signed as a free agent with the Pittsburgh Pirates.
 February 28, 1985: Rick Reuschel was signed as a free agent by the Pirates.
 March 1, 1985: Scott Loucks was signed as a free agent by the Pirates.

Regular season

Season standings

Record vs. opponents

Game log

|- bgcolor="ffbbbb"
| 1 || April 9 || @ Cubs || 1–2 || Sutcliffe || Rhoden (0–1) || Smith || 34,551 || 0–1
|- bgcolor="ffbbbb"
| 2 || April 11 || @ Cubs || 1–4 || Trout || DeLeon (0–1) || — || 10,049 || 0–2
|- bgcolor="ccffcc"
| 3 || April 12 || Cardinals || 6–4 || Robinson (1–0) || Kepshire || Candelaria (1) || 47,335 || 1–2
|- bgcolor="ccffcc"
| 4 || April 13 || Cardinals || 4–3 || Candelaria (1–0) || Campbell || — || 9,171 || 2–2
|- bgcolor="ffbbbb"
| 5 || April 14 || Cardinals || 4–10 || Andujar || Rhoden (0–2) || — || 12,483 || 2–3
|- bgcolor="ccffcc"
| 6 || April 15 || Mets || 4–1 || Bielecki (1–0) || Latham || Candelaria (2) || 5,575 || 3–3
|- bgcolor="ffbbbb"
| 7 || April 16 || Mets || 1–2 || Orosco || Candelaria (1–1) || — || 5,879 || 3–4
|- bgcolor="ffbbbb"
| 8 || April 17 || Mets || 6–10 || Sisk || McWilliams (0–1) || — || 14,029 || 3–5
|- bgcolor="ffbbbb"
| 9 || April 19 || @ Cardinals || 4–5 || Andujar || Candelaria (1–2) || Allen || 30,510 || 3–6
|- bgcolor="ffbbbb"
| 10 || April 20 || @ Cardinals || 3–4 || Cox || Tunnell (0–1) || Allen || 32,978 || 3–7
|- bgcolor="ffbbbb"
| 11 || April 21 || @ Cardinals || 0–6 || Forsch || DeLeon (0–2) || — || 28,880 || 3–8
|- bgcolor="ccffcc"
| 12 || April 22 || Cubs || 5–3 || McWilliams (1–1) || Ruthven || Candelaria (3) || 6,329 || 4–8
|- bgcolor="ffbbbb"
| 13 || April 23 || Cubs || 0–5 || Sutcliffe || Bielecki (1–1) || — || 9,387 || 4–9
|- bgcolor="ffbbbb"
| 14 || April 24 || Cubs || 2–5 || Trout || Rhoden (0–3) || Smith || 3,981 || 4–10
|- bgcolor="ffbbbb"
| 15 || April 26 || @ Mets || 0–6 || Darling || DeLeon (0–3) || — || 31,846 || 4–11
|- bgcolor="ccffcc"
| 16 || April 27 || @ Mets || 3–2 || McWilliams (2–1) || Orosco || Candelaria (4) || 24,786 || 5–11
|- bgcolor="ffbbbb"
| 17 || April 28 || @ Mets || 4–5 (18) || Gorman || Tunnell (0–2) || — || 36,423 || 5–12
|- bgcolor="ccffcc"
| 18 || April 30 || Padres || 6–2 || Rhoden (1–3) || Hoyt || Holland (1) || 6,166 || 6–12
|-

|- bgcolor="ffbbbb"
| 19 || May 1 || Padres || 4–6 || Show || DeLeon (0–4) || Gossage || 3,845 || 6–13
|- bgcolor="ccffcc"
| 20 || May 3 || Dodgers || 16–2 || McWilliams (3–1) || Honeycutt || — || 17,628 || 7–13
|- bgcolor="ffbbbb"
| 21 || May 4 || Dodgers || 5–6 (10) || Valenzuela || Candelaria (1–3) || — || 14,093 || 7–14
|- bgcolor="ccffcc"
| 22 || May 5 || Dodgers || 3–2 || Rhoden (2–3) || Niedenfuer || Candelaria (5) || 17,043 || 8–14
|- bgcolor="ffbbbb"
| 23 || May 6 || Giants || 5–7 || Laskey || DeLeon (0–5) || Garrelts || 4,533 || 8–15
|- bgcolor="ffbbbb"
| 24 || May 7 || Giants || 3–5 || Gott || Tunnell (0–3) || Garrelts || 4,587 || 8–16
|- bgcolor="ffbbbb"
| 25 || May 8 || @ Padres || 2–12 || Hawkins || McWilliams (3–2) || — || 22,092 || 8–17
|- bgcolor="ffbbbb"
| 26 || May 9 || @ Padres || 0–1 || Thurmond || Bielecki (1–2) || — || 24,882 || 8–18
|- bgcolor="ffbbbb"
| 27 || May 10 || @ Dodgers || 0–1 || Reuss || Rhoden (2–4) || Howe || 48,681 || 8–19
|- bgcolor="ccffcc"
| 28 || May 11 || @ Dodgers || 5–2 (12) || Holland (1–0) || Brennan || — || 42,957 || 9–19
|- bgcolor="ffbbbb"
| 29 || May 12 || @ Dodgers || 0–2 || Castillo || Tunnell (0–4) || Niedenfuer || 40,924 || 9–20
|- bgcolor="ffbbbb"
| 30 || May 14 || @ Giants || 1–3 || Krukow || McWilliams (3–3) || — || 4,484 || 9–21
|- bgcolor="ccffcc"
| 31 || May 15 || @ Giants || 3–2 || Robinson (2–0) || Garrelts || — || 6,852 || 10–21
|- bgcolor="ffbbbb"
| 32 || May 17 || Reds || 3–6 || Stuper || DeLeon (0–6) || Power || 7,239 || 10–22
|- bgcolor="ffbbbb"
| 33 || May 18 || Reds || 0–8 || Browning || Bielecki (1–3) || — || 9,708 || 10–23
|- bgcolor="ffbbbb"
| 34 || May 19 || Reds || 1–7 || Soto || Tunnell (0–5) || — || 11,990 || 10–24
|- bgcolor="ccffcc"
| 35 || May 20 || Astros || 3–1 || Rhoden (3–4) || Niekro || Holland (2) || 4,768 || 11–24
|- bgcolor="ccffcc"
| 36 || May 21 || Astros || 3–2 || Reuschel (1–0) || Scott || Candelaria (6) || 5,146 || 12–24
|- bgcolor="ffbbbb"
| 37 || May 22 || Astros || 3–5 (10) || Dawley || Holland (1–1) || Smith || 10,681 || 12–25
|- bgcolor="ccffcc"
| 38 || May 24 || @ Braves || 4–2 || Winn (1–0) || Bedrosian || Candelaria (7) || 18,490 || 13–25
|- bgcolor="ccffcc"
| 39 || May 25 || @ Braves || 8–2 || Rhoden (4–4) || Perez || — || 31,177 || 14–25
|- bgcolor="ffbbbb"
| 40 || May 26 || @ Braves || 4–5 (10) || Dedmon || Krawczyk (0–1) || — || 21,723 || 14–26
|- bgcolor="ffbbbb"
| 41 || May 27 || @ Astros || 2–4 || Knepper || DeLeon (0–7) || Smith || 9,692 || 14–27
|- bgcolor="ccffcc"
| 42 || May 28 || @ Astros || 4–3 (12) || Guante (1–0) || Solano || — || 8,686 || 15–27
|- bgcolor="ffbbbb"
| 43 || May 29 || @ Astros || 3–8 || Ryan || Krawczyk (0–2) || — || 10,133 || 15–28
|- bgcolor="ffbbbb"
| 44 || May 31 || Braves || 2–8 || Camp || Rhoden (4–5) || — || 7,822 || 15–29
|-

|- bgcolor="ccffcc"
| 45 || June 1 || Braves || 6–3 || Reuschel (2–0) || Garber || Scurry (1) || 14,579 || 16–29
|- bgcolor="ccffcc"
| 46 || June 2 || Braves || 5–0 || DeLeon (1–7) || Bedrosian || Holland (3) || 15,034 || 17–29
|- bgcolor="ffbbbb"
| 47 || June 4 || @ Reds || 3–9 || Soto || Guante (1–1) || — || 13,222 || 17–30
|- bgcolor="ffbbbb"
| 48 || June 5 || @ Reds || 9–11 || Pastore || Robinson (2–1) || Franco || 12,540 || 17–31
|- bgcolor="ffbbbb"
| 49 || June 6 || @ Cubs || 2–3 (12) || Brusstar || Holland (1–2) || — || 22,368 || 17–32
|- bgcolor="ffbbbb"
| 50 || June 7 || @ Cubs || 0–1 || Sutcliffe || DeLeon (1–8) || — || 37,414 || 17–33
|- bgcolor="ffbbbb"
| 51 || June 8 || @ Cubs || 3–7 || Trout || McWilliams (3–4) || — || 35,232 || 17–34
|- bgcolor="ffbbbb"
| 52 || June 9 || @ Cubs || 1–5 || Ruthven || Winn (1–1) || Brusstar || 36,475 || 17–35
|- bgcolor="ffbbbb"
| 53 || June 10 || Cardinals || 1–6 || Cox || Rhoden (4–6) || — || 5,557 || 17–36
|- bgcolor="ccffcc"
| 54 || June 11 || Cardinals || 13–2 || Reuschel (3–0) || Allen || — || 4,817 || 18–36
|- bgcolor="ffbbbb"
| 55 || June 13 || Cardinals || 1–2 || Tudor || McWilliams (3–5) || Lahti || 4,833 || 18–37
|- bgcolor="ccffcc"
| 56 || June 14 || Phillies || 3–2 || DeLeon (2–8) || Carman || Robinson (1) || 10,211 || 19–37
|- bgcolor="ffbbbb"
| 57 || June 15 || Phillies || 3–13 || Denny || Rhoden (4–7) || — || 10,897 || 19–38
|- bgcolor="ffbbbb"
| 58 || June 16 || Phillies || 2–3 || Hudson || Reuschel (3–1) || Tekulve || 14,451 || 19–39
|- bgcolor="ccffcc"
| 59 || June 17 || @ Expos || 5–2 || Winn (2–1) || Palmer || Robinson (2) || 18,634 || 20–39
|- bgcolor="ccffcc"
| 60 || June 18 || @ Expos || 4–1 || McWilliams (4–5) || Smith || — || 24,318 || 21–39
|- bgcolor="ffbbbb"
| 61 || June 19 || @ Expos || 3–4 || Burke || DeLeon (2–9) || Reardon || 10,204 || 21–40
|- bgcolor="ccffcc"
| 62 || June 20 || @ Expos || 2–1 || Rhoden (5–7) || Schatzeder || Holland (4) || 15,157 || 22–40
|- bgcolor="ffbbbb"
| 63 || June 21 || @ Phillies || 3–4 (16) || Andersen || Winn (2–2) || — || 22,493 || 22–41
|- bgcolor="ffbbbb"
| 64 || June 22 || @ Phillies || 2–5 || Carman || Robinson (2–2) || — || 23,623 || 22–42
|- bgcolor="ffbbbb"
| 65 || June 23 || @ Phillies || 2–3 || Carman || Winn (2–3) || — || 29,082 || 22–43
|- bgcolor="ffbbbb"
| 66 || June 25 || Expos || 2–3 || Burke || Holland (1–3) || Reardon || 6,874 || 22–44
|- bgcolor="ccffcc"
| 67 || June 26 || Expos || 11–2 || Reuschel (4–1) || O'Connor || — || 16,770 || 23–44
|- bgcolor="ffbbbb"
| 68 || June 27 || Expos || 2–4 || Palmer || McWilliams (4–6) || Reardon || 9,517 || 23–45
|- bgcolor="ffbbbb"
| 69 || June 28 || Cubs || 0–5 || Trout || DeLeon (2–10) || — || 16,432 || 23–46
|- bgcolor="ccffcc"
| 70 || June 29 || Cubs || 6–5 (15) || Reuschel (5–1) || Frazier || — || 13,934 || 24–46
|- bgcolor="ffbbbb"
| 71 || June 30 || Cubs || 2–9 || Sanderson || Robinson (2–3) || — || 31,384 || 24–47
|-

|- bgcolor="ccffcc"
| 72 || July 1 || @ Mets || 1–0 || Reuschel (6–1) || Fernandez || Candelaria (8) || 21,610 || 25–47
|- bgcolor="ffbbbb"
| 73 || July 2 || @ Mets || 4–5 || Darling || McWilliams (4–7) || McDowell || 22,651 || 25–48
|- bgcolor="ffbbbb"
| 74 || July 3 || @ Mets || 2–6 || Lynch || DeLeon (2–11) || — || 46,220 || 25–49
|- bgcolor="ffbbbb"
| 75 || July 4 || Padres || 1–9 || Show || Rhoden (5–8) || — || 10,102 || 25–50
|- bgcolor="ccffcc"
| 76 || July 5 || Padres || 5–4 (12) || Reuschel (7–1) || Lefferts || — || 8,986 || 26–50
|- bgcolor="ccffcc"
| 77 || July 6 || Padres || 8–7 || Candelaria (2–3) || Lefferts || — || 10,281 || 27–50
|- bgcolor="ffbbbb"
| 78 || July 7 || Padres || 0–3 || Hoyt || Reuschel (7–2) || — || 11,608 || 27–51
|- bgcolor="ffbbbb"
| 79 || July 8 || Dodgers || 3–4 || Valenzuela || DeLeon (2–12) || — || 6,537 || 27–52
|- bgcolor="ffbbbb"
| 80 || July 9 || Dodgers || 3–8 || Honeycutt || Rhoden (5–9) || Niedenfuer || 6,748 || 27–53
|- bgcolor="ffbbbb"
| 81 || July 10 || Dodgers || 4–5 || Reuss || Tunnell (0–6) || Howell || 12,934 || 27–54
|- bgcolor="ccffcc"
| 82 || July 11 || Giants || 6–4 || Guante (2–1) || Krukow || — || 5,188 || 28–54
|- bgcolor="ccffcc"
| 83 || July 12 || Giants || 3–1 || Reuschel (8–2) || Gott || Candelaria (9) || 7,915 || 29–54
|- bgcolor="ffbbbb"
| 84 || July 13 || Giants || 1–4 || LaPoint || DeLeon (2–13) || — || 10,050 || 29–55
|- bgcolor="ffbbbb"
| 85 || July 14 || Giants || 3–7 || Laskey || Rhoden (5–10) || Davis || 18,313 || 29–56
|- bgcolor="ffbbbb"
| 86 || July 18 || @ Padres || 2–3 || Lefferts || Candelaria (2–4) || Gossage || 20,740 || 29–57
|- bgcolor="ffbbbb"
| 87 || July 19 || @ Padres || 0–6 || Hawkins || DeLeon (2–14) || — || 30,386 || 29–58
|- bgcolor="ffbbbb"
| 88 || July 20 || @ Padres || 2–4 || Hoyt || Rhoden (5–11) || Gossage || 36,340 || 29–59
|- bgcolor="ccffcc"
| 89 || July 21 || @ Padres || 5–2 || Tunnell (1–6) || Show || — || 23,481 || 30–59
|- bgcolor="ccffcc"
| 90 || July 22 || @ Dodgers || 6–3 || McWilliams (5–7) || Honeycutt || Guante (1) || 29,888 || 31–59
|- bgcolor="ffbbbb"
| 91 || July 23 || @ Dodgers || 0–6 || Hershiser || Reuschel (8–3) || — || 33,013 || 31–60
|- bgcolor="ffbbbb"
| 92 || July 24 || @ Dodgers || 1–9 || Welch || Robinson (2–4) || — || 34,051 || 31–61
|- bgcolor="ffbbbb"
| 93 || July 25 || @ Giants || 3–4 || Minton || Guante (2–2) || — || 3,821 || 31–62
|- bgcolor="ffbbbb"
| 94 || July 26 || @ Giants || 1–3 || Laskey || Tunnell (1–7) || Garrelts || 5,305 || 31–63
|- bgcolor="ffbbbb"
| 95 || July 27 || @ Giants || 3–8 || LaPoint || Robinson (2–5) || Minton || 8,271 || 31–64
|- bgcolor="ffbbbb"
| 96 || July 28 || @ Giants || 2–3 (10) || Garrelts || Guante (2–3) || — || 10,976 || 31–65
|- bgcolor="ffbbbb"
| 97 || July 30 || Phillies || 0–2 || Gross || Rhoden (5–12) || Tekulve || 7,496 || 31–66
|- bgcolor="ccffcc"
| 98 || July 31 || Phillies || 4–3 (10) || Guante (3–3) || Tekulve || — || 6,797 || 32–66
|-

|- bgcolor="ffbbbb"
| 99 || August 1 || Phillies || 0–3 || Denny || Robinson (2–6) || — || 6,199 || 32–67
|- bgcolor="ffbbbb"
| 100 || August 2 || Expos || 2–3 || Hesketh || Reuschel (8–4) || Reardon || 6,705 || 32–68
|- bgcolor="ffbbbb"
| 101 || August 3 || Expos || 5–6 || Roberge || McWilliams (5–8) || Reardon || 10,593 || 32–69
|- bgcolor="ccffcc"
| 102 || August 4 || Expos || 4–3 || Rhoden (6–12) || Gullickson || Guante (2) || 10,981 || 33–69
|- bgcolor="ffbbbb"
| 103 || August 5 || Expos || 2–5 || Burke || Winn (2–4) || Reardon || 7,838 || 33–70
|- bgcolor="ffbbbb"
| 104 || August 8 || @ Phillies || 3–7 || Denny || Robinson (2–7) || Carman || 18,142 || 33–71
|- bgcolor="ffbbbb"
| 105 || August 9 || @ Expos || 2–7 || Smith || Reuschel (8–5) || Reardon || 18,165 || 33–72
|- bgcolor="ffbbbb"
| 106 || August 10 || @ Expos || 5–7 || St. Claire || Rhoden (6–13) || Roberge || 19,982 || 33–73
|- bgcolor="ffbbbb"
| 107 || August 11 || @ Expos || 5–6 || Burke || Guante (3–4) || — || 21,741 || 33–74
|- bgcolor="ffbbbb"
| 108 || August 12 || @ Cardinals || 1–8 || Tudor || Winn (2–5) || — || 24,516 || 33–75
|- bgcolor="ffbbbb"
| 109 || August 13 || @ Cardinals || 5–6 || Andujar || Robinson (2–8) || Dayley || 30,469 || 33–76
|- bgcolor="ffbbbb"
| 110 || August 15 || @ Cardinals || 1–3 || Kepshire || Reuschel (8–6) || Dayley ||  || 33–77
|- bgcolor="ffbbbb"
| 111 || August 15 || @ Cardinals || 3–4 (12) || Campbell || Guante (3–5) || — || 34,170 || 33–78
|- bgcolor="ccffcc"
| 112 || August 16 || Mets || 7–1 || Rhoden (7–13) || Lynch || — || 9,289 || 34–78
|- bgcolor="ffbbbb"
| 113 || August 17 || Mets || 3–4 || Fernandez || Tunnell (1–8) || McDowell || 10,200 || 34–79
|- bgcolor="ccffcc"
| 114 || August 18 || Mets || 5–0 || Robinson (3–8) || Aguilera || Clements (1) || 14,508 || 35–79
|- bgcolor="ccffcc"
| 115 || August 20 || Reds || 3–2 || Reuschel (9–6) || Soto || — || 7,827 || 36–79
|- bgcolor="ffbbbb"
| 116 || August 21 || Reds || 5–8 || Browning || Walk (0–1) || Franco || 17,198 || 36–80
|- bgcolor="ccffcc"
| 117 || August 22 || Reds || 5–1 || Rhoden (8–13) || Tibbs || Scurry (2) || 10,437 || 37–80
|- bgcolor="ffbbbb"
| 118 || August 23 || Astros || 0–2 (10) || Dawley || Clements (0–1) || DiPino || 4,198 || 37–81
|- bgcolor="ccffcc"
| 119 || August 25 || Astros || 9–3 || Reuschel (10–6) || Scott || — ||  || 38–81
|- bgcolor="ccffcc"
| 120 || August 25 || Astros || 10–9 || Robinson (4–8) || Calhoun || — || 7,929 || 39–81
|- bgcolor="ffbbbb"
| 121 || August 26 || @ Braves || 1–2 || Garber || Robinson (4–9) || — || 4,125 || 39–82
|- bgcolor="ffbbbb"
| 122 || August 27 || @ Braves || 6–7 || Garber || Robinson (4–10) || — || 4,580 || 39–83
|- bgcolor="ffbbbb"
| 123 || August 28 || @ Braves || 1–6 || Barker || Tunnell (1–9) || McMurtry || 5,187 || 39–84
|- bgcolor="ffbbbb"
| 124 || August 29 || @ Reds || 0–6 || Browning || DeLeon (2–15) || — || 18,789 || 39–85
|- bgcolor="ffbbbb"
| 125 || August 30 || @ Reds || 0–1 || Tibbs || Reuschel (10–7) || — || 21,253 || 39–86
|- bgcolor="ccffcc"
| 126 || August 31 || @ Reds || 6–0 || Walk (1–1) || McGaffigan || — || 28,656 || 40–86
|-

|- bgcolor="ffbbbb"
| 127 || September 1 || @ Reds || 2–3 || Soto || Scurry (0–1) || Franco || 30,062 || 40–87
|- bgcolor="ccffcc"
| 128 || September 2 || Braves || 5–4 || Tunnell (2–9) || Mahler || Guante (3) || 5,378 || 41–87
|- bgcolor="ffbbbb"
| 129 || September 3 || Braves || 0–2 || Johnson || DeLeon (2–16) || Sutter || 3,019 || 41–88
|- bgcolor="ccffcc"
| 130 || September 4 || Braves || 2–0 || Reuschel (11–7) || Perez || — || 4,613 || 42–88
|- bgcolor="ffbbbb"
| 131 || September 5 || @ Astros || 3–4 || Knepper || Walk (1–2) || Smith || 6,003 || 42–89
|- bgcolor="ffbbbb"
| 132 || September 6 || @ Astros || 3–4 (10) || Dawley || Robinson (4–11) || — || 7,163 || 42–90
|- bgcolor="ccffcc"
| 133 || September 7 || @ Astros || 7–1 || Tunnell (3–9) || Kerfeld || — || 15,999 || 43–90
|- bgcolor="ccffcc"
| 134 || September 10 || Cubs || 2–1 || Reuschel (12–7) || Engel || — || 3,133 || 44–90
|- bgcolor="ffbbbb"
| 135 || September 11 || Cubs || 1–3 || Meridith || DeLeon (2–17) || Baller || 5,432 || 44–91
|- bgcolor="ccffcc"
| 136 || September 12 || Cubs || 10–2 || Rhoden (9–13) || Eckersley || Robinson (3) || 3,439 || 45–91
|- bgcolor="ffbbbb"
| 137 || September 13 || Phillies || 3–6 || Denny || Walk (1–3) || Tekulve || 4,429 || 45–92
|- bgcolor="ccffcc"
| 138 || September 14 || Phillies || 6–3 || Tunnell (4–9) || Carlton || Guante (4) || 5,549 || 46–92
|- bgcolor="ccffcc"
| 139 || September 15 || Phillies || 5–4 || Reuschel (13–7) || Shipanoff || — || 5,961 || 47–92
|- bgcolor="ffbbbb"
| 140 || September 16 || Cardinals || 4–8 || Tudor || DeLeon (2–18) || Worrell ||  || 47–93
|- bgcolor="ffbbbb"
| 141 || September 16 || Cardinals || 1–3 || Perry || Clements (0–2) || — || 3,601 || 47–94
|- bgcolor="ffbbbb"
| 142 || September 17 || Cardinals || 4–10 || Andujar || Kipper (0–1) || — || 3,924 || 47–95
|- bgcolor="ccffcc"
| 143 || September 18 || @ Expos || 10–6 (11) || Robinson (5–11) || Roberge || — || 8,448 || 48–95
|- bgcolor="ccffcc"
| 144 || September 19 || @ Expos || 8–6 (10) || Winn (3–5) || Burke || — || 7,627 || 49–95
|- bgcolor="ccffcc"
| 145 || September 20 || @ Mets || 7–5 (11) || Guante (4–5) || Latham || DeLeon (1) || 33,803 || 50–95
|- bgcolor="ffbbbb"
| 146 || September 21 || @ Mets || 1–12 || Gooden || Rhoden (9–14) || — || 49,931 || 50–96
|- bgcolor="ccffcc"
| 147 || September 22 || @ Mets || 5–3 || Kipper (1–1) || Leach || Clements (2) || 35,679 || 51–96
|- bgcolor="ffbbbb"
| 148 || September 23 || @ Cardinals || 4–5 || Lahti || Guante (4–6) || Worrell || 17,611 || 51–97
|- bgcolor="ffbbbb"
| 149 || September 24 || @ Cardinals || 4–5 || Horton || Tunnell (4–10) || Dayley || 20,054 || 51–98
|- bgcolor="ccffcc"
| 150 || September 25 || Expos || 8–2 || Reuschel (14–7) || Laskey || — || 2,648 || 52–98
|- bgcolor="ccffcc"
| 151 || September 27 || Mets || 8–7 || McWilliams (6–8) || Gardner || DeLeon (2) || 4,843 || 53–98
|- bgcolor="ffbbbb"
| 152 || September 28 || Mets || 1–3 || Aguilera || Kipper (1–2) || Orosco || 4,410 || 53–99
|- bgcolor="ffbbbb"
| 153 || September 29 || Mets || 7–9 (10) || Orosco || McWilliams (6–9) || — || 13,956 || 53–100
|-

|- bgcolor="ffbbbb"
| 154 || October 1 || @ Cubs || 3–4 || Patterson || Reuschel (14–8) || Smith || 3,446 || 53–101
|- bgcolor="ccffcc"
| 155 || October 2 || @ Cubs || 9–4 || Rhoden (10–14) || Sutcliffe || Guante (5) || 4,637 || 54–101
|- bgcolor="ffbbbb"
| 156 || October 3 || @ Cubs || 5–13 || Perlman || Winn (3–6) || Engel || 7,437 || 54–102
|- bgcolor="ccffcc"
| 157 || October 4 || @ Phillies || 7–2 || Walk (2–3) || Denny || DeLeon (3) ||  || 55–102
|- bgcolor="ffbbbb"
| 158 || October 4 || @ Phillies || 5–8 || Carman || DeLeon (2–19) || — || 12,410 || 55–103
|- bgcolor="ccffcc"
| 159 || October 5 || @ Phillies || 4–2 || McWilliams (7–9) || Toliver || Reuschel (1) ||  || 56–103
|- bgcolor="ccffcc"
| 160 || October 5 || @ Phillies || 5–0 || Bielecki (2–3) || Childress || — || 21,820 || 57–103
|- bgcolor="ffbbbb"
| 161 || October 6 || @ Phillies || 0–5 || Gross || Rhoden (10–15) || — || 13,749 || 57–104
|-

|-
| Legend:       = Win       = LossBold = Pirates team member

Roster

Opening Day lineup

Player stats
Batting
Note: G = Games played; AB = At bats; H = Hits; Avg. = Batting average; HR = Home runs; RBI = Runs batted in

Pitching
Note: G = Games pitched; IP = Innings pitched; W = Wins; L = Losses; ERA = Earned run average; SO = Strikeouts

Awards and honors
Rick Rueschel, Hutch Award, National League Comeback Player of the Year

1985 Major League Baseball All-Star Game
 Tony Peña, C, Reserve

Transactions
 October 15, 1984 – Dale Mohorcic granted free agency.
 October 15, 1984 – Nelson Norman granted free agency.
 October 15, 1984 – Kelly Paris granted free agency.
 November 8, 1984 – Lee Lacy granted free agency.
 November 8, 1984 – Milt May granted free agency.
 December 3, 1984 – Drafted Junior Ortiz from the New York Mets in the 1984 rule 5 draft.
 December 12, 1984 – Traded Brian Harper and John Tudor to the St. Louis Cardinals. Received Steve Barnard (minors) and George Hendrick.
 December 20, 1984 – Traded Dale Berra, Jay Buhner and Alfonso Pulido to the New York Yankees. Received Tim Foli, Steve Kemp and cash.
 January 3, 1985 – Drafted Greg Vaughn in the 1st round (19th pick) of the 1985 amateur draft (January Secondary), but did not sign the player.
 January 3, 1985 – Drafted Derek Lee in the 9th round of the 1985 amateur draft (January), but did not sign the player.
 January 15, 1985 – Signed Juan Eichelberger as a free agent.
 January 22, 1985 – Signed Sixto Lezcano as a free agent.
 February 22, 1985 – Signed Orlando Merced as an amateur free agent.
 February 28, 1985 – Signed Rick Reuschel as a free agent.
 March 1, 1985 – Signed Scott Loucks as a free agent.
 April 7, 1985 – Released Juan Eichelberger.
 April 8, 1985 – Signed Bill Almon as a free agent.
 April 11, 1985 – Signed Jerry Dybzinski as a free agent.
 April 11, 1985 – Signed John Henry Johnson as a free agent.
 April 20, 1985 – Traded Kent Tekulve to the Philadelphia Phillies. Received Frankie Griffin (minors) and Al Holland.
 April 21, 1985 - Signed Larry Carroll to Watertown as free agent.  University of Michigan.
 April 27, 1985 – Traded Steve Herz (minors) to the Philadelphia Phillies. Received Mike Diaz.
 May 30, 1985 – Traded a player to be named later to the Cleveland Indians. Received Johnnie LeMaster. The Pittsburgh Pirates sent Scott Bailes (July 3, 1985) to the Cleveland Indians to complete the trade.
 June 3, 1985 – Drafted Tommy Hinzo in the 1st round (4th pick) of the 1985 amateur draft (June Secondary), but did not sign the player.
 June 3, 1985 – Drafted Barry Bonds in the 1st round (6th pick) of the 1985 amateur draft. Player signed June 5, 1985.
 June 3, 1985 – Drafted Brett Gideon in the 6th round of the 1985 amateur draft.
 June 3, 1985 – Drafted Tommy Gregg in the 7th round of the 1985 amateur draft. Player signed June 7, 1985.
 June 3, 1985 – Drafted Bill Sampen in the 12th round of the 1985 amateur draft.
 June 3, 1985 – Drafted Tommy Shields in the 36th round of the 1985 amateur draft, but did not sign the player.
 June 17, 1985 – Released Tim Foli.
 July 26, 1985 – Released John Henry Johnson.
 August 2, 1985 – Traded John Candelaria, George Hendrick and Al Holland to the California Angels. Received a player to be named later, Mike Brown and Pat Clements. The California Angels sent Bob Kipper (August 16, 1985) to the Pittsburgh Pirates to complete the trade.
 August 12, 1985 – Sold Doug Frobel to the Montreal Expos.
 August 31, 1985 – Traded Bill Madlock to the Los Angeles Dodgers. Received players to be named later. The Los Angeles Dodgers sent R.J. Reynolds (September 3, 1985), Cecil Espy (September 9, 1985) and Sid Bream (September 9, 1985) to the Pittsburgh Pirates to complete the trade.
 September 14, 1985 – Sold Rod Scurry to the New York Yankees.
 October 4, 1985 – Released Jerry Dybzinski.
 October 4, 1985 – Released Mitchell Page.
 October 4, 1985 – Released Eddie Vargas.
 October 15, 1985 – Dave Tomlin granted free agency.

Farm system

References 

 1985 Pittsburgh Pirates at Baseball Reference
 1985 Pittsburgh Pirates at Baseball Almanac

Pittsburgh Pirates seasons
Pittsburgh Pirates season
Pitts